Tachev, female Tacheva is a Bulgarian surname. Notable people with the surname include:

 Petar Tachev (born 1938), Bulgarian weightlifter
 Vasil Tachev (born 1992), Bulgarian footballer
 Margarita Tacheva (1936–2008), Bulgarian historian

Bulgarian-language surnames